Aghdashloo is a surname. Notable people with the surname include:

 Aydin Aghdashloo (born 1940), Iranian painter, graphist, art curator, cognoscente, writer, and film critic
 Shohreh Aghdashloo (born 1952), American film actor and activist
 Tara Aghdashloo (born 1988), Iranian-Canadian writer, director, producer and curator based in London